Philippe Léotard (his full name was Ange Philippe Paul André Léotard-Tomasi; 28 August 1940 – 25 August 2001) was a French actor, poet and singer.

Biography
He was born in Nice, one of seven children - four girls, then three boys, of which he was the oldest - and was the brother of politician François Léotard. His childhood was normal except for an illness (rheumatic fever) which struck him and forced him to spend days in bed during which time he read a great many books. He was particularly fond of the poets - Baudelaire, Rimbaud, Lautréamont, Blaise Cendrars. He met Ariane Mnouchkine at the Sorbonne and in 1964. Together with students of the L'École Internationale de Théâtre Jacques Lecoq, they formed the Parisian avant-garde stage ensemble, Théâtre du Soleil.

He played Philippe, the tormented son of a woman with terminal illness in the 1974 drama film La Gueule ouverte by the controversial director Maurice Pialat. He won a César Award for Best Actor for his role in the 1982 movie La Balance.

One of his few English-language roles was a cameo in the 1973 thriller The Day of the Jackal and he co-starred as "Jacques" in the 1975 John Frankenheimer movie French Connection II which starred Gene Hackman and Fernando Rey, (sequel to The French Connection).

Léotard died in 2001 of respiratory failure in Paris at the age of 60. He was buried at the Montparnasse Cemetery in Paris.

Filmography

Discography 
 1990: À l'amour comme à la guerre
 1994: Philippe Léotard chante Léo Ferré (tribute album)
 1996: Je rêve que je dors
 2000: Demi-mots amers

References

External links
BBC News obituary

1940 births
2001 deaths
Lycée Henri-IV alumni
University of Paris alumni
Male actors from Nice, France
French people of Corsican descent
Burials at Montparnasse Cemetery
20th-century French male actors
French male film actors
French male television actors
French male stage actors
Deaths from respiratory failure